Richland Township is one of twelve townships in Dickinson County, Iowa, USA.  As of the 2000 census, its population was 261.

Geography
According to the United States Census Bureau, Richland Township covers an area of 36.37 square miles (94.19 square kilometers); of this, 36.1 square miles (93.5 square kilometers, 99.27 percent) is land and 0.26 square miles (0.69 square kilometers, 0.73 percent) is water.

Cities, towns, villages
 Superior (south edge)

Adjacent townships
 Superior Township (north)
 Emmet Township, Emmet County (northeast)
 Estherville Township, Emmet County (east)
 Twelve Mile Lake Township, Emmet County (southeast)
 Lloyd Township (south)
 Milford Township (southwest)
 Center Grove Township (west)
 Spirit Lake Township (northwest)

Cemeteries
The township contains Richland Cemetery (historical).

Major highways
  U.S. Route 71
  Iowa Highway 9

Lakes
 Fourmile Lake
 Lily Lake
 Pleasant Lake

School districts
 Estherville Lincoln Central Com School District
 Spirit Lake Community School District
 Terril Community School District

Political districts
 Iowa's 4th congressional district
 State House District 06
 State Senate District 03

References
 United States Census Bureau 2007 TIGER/Line Shapefiles
 United States Board on Geographic Names (GNIS)
 United States National Atlas

External links

 
US-Counties.com
City-Data.com

Townships in Dickinson County, Iowa
Townships in Iowa